Daniel Trumbull Huntington (born August 4, 1868) was an American missionary to China.

Huntington was born in Norwich, Connecticut, educated at Yale University and ordained in 1896. He was consecrated a bishop on the Feast of the Annunciation 1912 (25 March) by his predecessor Frederick Graves at St John's Pro-Cathedral, Shanghai; he served as Missionary Bishop of Anking and later as sixth missionary bishop of the Anglican diocese of Shanghai.

References

1868 births
Year of death missing
Religious leaders from Norwich, Connecticut
Yale University alumni
Bishops of the Episcopal Church (United States)
20th-century Anglican bishops in China
Episcopal bishops of Shanghai
Episcopal bishops of Anking
20th-century American clergy